1712 Angola, provisional designation , is a dark asteroid from the outer regions of the asteroid belt, approximately 66 kilometers in diameter. It was discovered on 28 May 1935, by English-born South African astronomer Cyril Jackson at Johannesburg Observatory in South Africa. It is named after the Republic of Angola.

Orbit 

Angola orbits the Sun in the outer main-belt at a distance of 2.7–3.6 AU once every 5 years and 8 months (2,058 days). Its orbit has an eccentricity of 0.15 and an inclination of 19° with respect to the ecliptic.

Lightcurve 

In July 2003, French amateur astronomer René Roy obtained a rotational lightcurve of Angola. It gave a well-defined rotation period of 11.5274 hours with a brightness variation of 0.38 magnitude. Photometric observations by ESO's CCD-specialist Cyril Cavadore gave an identical period of 11.53 hours with an insufficient amplitude of 0.02 magnitude.

Spectra, diameter and albedo 

According to the surveys carried out by the Infrared Astronomical Satellite IRAS, the Japanese Akari satellite, and NASA's Wide-field Infrared Survey Explorer (WISE) with its subsequent NEOWISE mission, Angola measures between 59.48 and 70.07 kilometers in diameter and its surface has an albedo between 0.029 and 0.060. The Collaborative Asteroid Lightcurve Link derives an albedo of 0.0458 and a diameter of 59.31 kilometers based on an absolute magnitude of 10.1. The carbonaceous C-type asteroid is also classified a dark P type by WISE.

Naming 

This minor planet is named for Angola, the state on the southwestern coast of Africa. The approved naming citation was published by the Minor Planet Center on 1 February 1980.

References

External links 
 Asteroid Lightcurve Database (LCDB), query form (info )
 Dictionary of Minor Planet Names, Google books
 Asteroids and comets rotation curves, CdR – Observatoire de Genève, Raoul Behrend
 Discovery Circumstances: Numbered Minor Planets (1)-(5000) – Minor Planet Center
 
 

001712
Discoveries by Cyril Jackson (astronomer)
Named minor planets
19350528